Angel Delight is the sixth album by the British folk rock band Fairport Convention, released in June 1971. This was the first Fairport Convention album without guitarist Richard Thompson, and the lineup consisted of Simon Nicol (guitar, vocals) (the only original group member), Dave Swarbrick (violin, vocals), Dave Pegg (bass, vocals), and Dave Mattacks (drums).

Production
The title derives from "The Angel" in Little Hadham, Hertfordshire, a former pub which the band were living in at the time, and the eponymous track is autobiographical, referring to "John the Wood" (co-producer), "Dave the Drum" (Mattacks), and even details such as "peer through the haze watching Top of the Pops". The band moved out of The Angel shortly after the album's release, partly because a lorry had crashed into Dave Swarbrick's bedroom.

The U.K. album cover included liner notes consisting of dialogue among band members and roadies preparing to leave "The Angel" for a gig, that was replaced on American and Canadian copies by a more straightforward, biographical liner essay.

Musically, Angel Delight progressed little from its predecessors, although an appearance on Top of the Pops as a featured album contributed to its chart success; it reached number eight on the UK Album chart, making it the band's highest charting album in the UK.

Reception

Angel Delight has received generally positive reviews from critics.

Track listing

Personnel
Fairport Convention 
 Dave Swarbrick – lead vocals (1,4,5,10,11), mandolin (2,6,8,9,10), vocals (2,6,7,9), fiddle (1,5,7,8,11), viola (9), cuckoo (8)
 Dave Pegg – bass guitar (1-2,4-8,10,11), vocals (1,2,4-7,9,10,11), lead guitar (10), viola (9), violin (3)
 Dave Mattacks – drums (1,2,4-11), percussion (8,10), vocals (1,4-7,10-11), harmonium and piano (4), tambourine (6), bass guitar (3)
 Simon Nicol – lead vocals (2,5), vocals (1,4-7,9,10,11), guitar (1,2,4-8,10,11), bass guitar (9), electric dulcimer (1,9), violin (3)

on 11:
 Richard Thompson – vocals, electric guitar

Title
The cover includes a photo of two cherubs kissing. The title may also be a reference to the UK dessert, Angel Delight.

References

1971 albums
Fairport Convention albums
Albums produced by John Wood (record producer)
Island Records albums
Albums produced by Dave Mattacks
Albums produced by Dave Pegg
Albums produced by Dave Swarbrick
Albums produced by Simon Nicol